Mahamane Alassane Haidara (born 1 January 1910 in Tombouctou, Mali; died 17 October 1981 in Tombouctou) was a politician from Mali who was elected to the French Senate in 1948.

He was the President of the National Assembly from 1961 to 1967.

References

External links
Page on the French Senate website

Malian politicians
Presidents of the National Assembly (Mali)
French Senators of the Fourth Republic
1910 births
1981 deaths
People from Timbuktu
Senators of French Sudan